Nadège Vanhee-Cybulski is a French fashion designer and the creative director of Hermès International.

Biography 

Nadège Vanhee-Cybulski studied at the Royal Academy of Fine Arts of Antwerp. She was the design director at the Olsen twins' brand, The Row, and also worked at Céline and Maison Martin Margiela.

In June 2014, she was appointed artistic director of Hermès' women ready-to-wear, replacing Christophe Lemaire. In March 2015, she presented her first collection, and stayed close to the brand's roots by choosing an equestrian theme.

References

Living people
French fashion designers
French women fashion designers
1978 births